Rotem Kowner (born 11 July 1960) is an Israeli historian and psychologist specializing in the history of modern Japan, and a full professor in the Department of Asian Studies at the University of Haifa.

Early life 
Rotem Kowner was born in Mikhmoret and lived his early years in the Kibbutz of Ma'ayan Tzvi. At the age of three, his family moved to Haifa, where he grew up and went to the Hebrew Reali School. Upon graduation, he entered the Israeli Navy and subsequently served as an officer on a missile boat.

Academic career 
After majoring in East Asian Studies and psychology at the Hebrew University of Jerusalem, he studied for a year at the Free University of Berlin and then for six years at the University of Tsukuba in Japan. Upon receiving his PhD, he continued in postdoctoral studies at the Center for East Asian Studies, Stanford University, and at the Hebrew University. In 1998 he began teaching at the University of Haifa as a senior lecturer and was promoted to professor in 2004. Kowner worked extensively to mark the centenary of the Russo-Japanese War and to stress its regional and global repercussions. He was involved in organizing international conferences, initiated collaborative works, and published several books as well as many articles about this topic. Since 2010, his research focus has shifted to the examination of the development of race and racism in modern East Asia and in Japan in particular. Kowner maintains that the question of race, the distress over foreign racism, and the implementation of racist policies in its own colonies have been among the most critical and painful issues in the history of modern Japan and that they were also among the determinants of its national decision-making, at least until the end of World War II.

Kowner has been as a visiting professor at Tokyo's Waseda University, the University of Geneva, and the Ludwig Maximilian University of Munich and serves on the editorial board of several academic journals. He is the co-founder of the biennial conferences of Asian Studies in Israel and the Israeli Association of Japanese Studies (IAJS). He has been member of the university's Senate, Board of Governors, and Executive Committee of his own university and currently serves as the director of its liberal arts program. He sits on the executive committee of the Maritime Policy & Strategy Research Center (HMS).

Works
 1997 – On Ignorance, Respect, and Suspicion: current Japanese attitudes towards Jews. Hebrew University of Jerusalem, Vidal Sassoon International Center for the Study of Antisemitism. ASIN B007HF0B82.
 2005 – The Forgotten War between Russia and Japan – and its heritage. Tel Aviv: Israeli Defence Ministry. 539 pp.
 2006 – Historical Dictionary of the Russo-Japanese War. Scarecrow Press Inc. . 640 pp.
 2007 – The Impact of the Russo-Japanese War. Routledge, UK. . 369 pp. 
 2007 – Rethinking the Russo-Japanese War 1904/05. Brill/Global Oriental. . 539 pp.
 2008 – Globally Speaking: Motives for Adopting English Vocabulary in Other Languages. Multilingual Matters. .
 2009 – The A to Z of the Russo-Japanese War. Scarecrow Press Inc. . 640 pp.
 2013 – (with Walter Demel) Race and Racism in Modern East Asia: Western and Eastern Constructions. Brill. . 618 pp.
 2014 – From White to Yellow: The Japanese in European Racial Thought, 1300–1735. Mcgill Queens University Press. . 706 pp.
 2015 – (with Walter Demel) Race and Racism in Modern East Asia (Vol. II): Interactions, Nationalism, Gender and Lineage. Brill. . 674 pp.

Selected articles
 1998 – Nicholas II and the Japanese Body: Images and Decision Making on the Eve of the Russo-Japanese War. Psychohistory Review.
 2000 – Lighter than yellow, but not enough: Western discourse on the Japanese 'race', 1854–1904. The Historical Journal 43, p. 103–131.
 2000 – Japan's Enlighteded War: Military Conduct and Attitudes to the Enemy during the Russo-Japanese War. The Japanese and Europe: Images and Perceoptions. Bert Edström.
 2001 – Becoming an Honorary Civilized Nation: The Russo-Japanese War and Western Perceptions of Japan. Historian.
 2004 – The skin as a metaphor: Early European racial perspectives on Japan, 1548–1853." Ethnohistory 51, p. 751–778.
 2011 – An Obscure History – Jews in Indonesia. Inside Indonesia.

Notes

References

Israeli historians
1960 births
Living people
Hebrew University of Jerusalem alumni
Academic staff of the University of Haifa
Israeli Japanologists